Gerrie & Louise is a 1997 Canadian documentary film directed by Sturla Gunnarsson. The film examines post-apartheid South Africa through the lens of Gerrie Hugo, a former officer in the South African Defence Force who fell in love with and married Louise Flanagan, a journalist investigating the SADF's role in various controversial events during the apartheid era.

The film had a theatrical screening at the 1997 Toronto International Film Festival, but was distributed primarily as a CBC Television broadcast.

Awards

References

External links 
 

1997 films
Documentary films about apartheid
Donald Brittain Award winning shows
Films directed by Sturla Gunnarsson
Canadian documentary television films
CBC Television original films
1990s English-language films
1990s Canadian films